Ardem Patapoutian (born 1967) is an Armenian-American molecular biologist, neuroscientist, and Nobel Prize laureate. He is known for his work in characterizing the PIEZO1, PIEZO2, and TRPM8 receptors that detect pressure, menthol, and temperature. Patapoutian is a neuroscience professor and Howard Hughes Medical Institute investigator at Scripps Research in La Jolla, California. In 2021, he won the Nobel Prize in Physiology or Medicine jointly with David Julius.

Early life
Ardem Patapoutian was born to an Armenian family in Beirut, Lebanon. His father, Sarkis Patapoutian (better known by the pen name ), is a poet and an accountant, while his mother, Haiguhi Adjemian, was the principal of an Armenian school in Beirut. He has a brother, Ara, and a sister, Houry. His ancestors survived the Armenian Genocide. He is childhood friends with journalist and author Vicken Cheterian. He attended the Demirdjian and Hovagimian Armenian schools in Beirut. He enrolled at the American University of Beirut for a year before emigrating to the United States in 1986. He received a B.S. degree in cell and developmental biology from the University of California, Los Angeles in 1990 and a Ph.D. degree in biology from the California Institute of Technology in 1996 under direction of Barbara Wold.

As a postdoctoral fellow, Patapoutian worked with Louis F. Reichardt at the University of California, San Francisco. In 2000, he became an assistant professor at the Scripps Research Institute. Between 2000 and 2014, he had an additional research position for the Novartis Research Foundation. Since 2014, Patapoutian has been an investigator for the Howard Hughes Medical Institute (HHMI).

Personal life
Patapoutian, a naturalized US citizen, lives in Del Mar, California with his wife Nancy Hong, a venture capitalist, and son, Luca.

Research
Patapoutian's research is into the biological receptors for temperature and touch (nociception). The knowledge is used to develop treatments for a range of diseases, including chronic pain. The discoveries made it possible to understand how heat, cold and mechanical forces trigger nerve impulses.

Patapoutian researches the signal transduction of sensors. Patapoutian and co-workers inactivated genes. In this way, they identified the gene, that made the cells insensitive for touch. The channel for the sense of touch was called PIEZO1. Through its similarity to PIEZO1, a second gene was discovered and named PIEZO2. This ion channel, the more important of the two mechanoreceptors, is essential for the sense of touch. PIEZO1 and PIEZO2 channels have been shown to regulate additional important physiological processes including blood pressure, respiration and urinary bladder control.

Patapoutian also made significant contributions to the identification of novel ion channels and receptors that are activated by temperature, mechanical forces or increased cell volume. Patapoutian and co-workers were able to show that these ion channels play an outstanding role in the sensation of temperature, in the sensation of touch, in proprioception, in the sensation of pain and in the regulation of vascular tone. More recent work uses functional genomics techniques to identify and characterize mechanosensitive ion channels (mechanotransduction).

Awards and honors

Patapoutian has an h-index of 68 according to Google Scholar, and of 63 according to Scopus. He has been a Fellow of the American Association for the Advancement of Science since 2016, a member of the National Academy of Sciences since 2017 and of the American Academy of Arts and Sciences since 2020.

In 2017, Patapoutian received the W. Alden Spencer Award, in 2019 the Rosenstiel Award, in 2020 the Kavli Prize for Neuroscience, and the BBVA Foundation Frontiers of Knowledge Award in Biology / Biomedicine.

In 2021, he was awarded the Nobel Prize in Physiology or Medicine jointly with David Julius for their discoveries of receptors for temperature and touch.

In October 2021 President of Lebanon Michel Aoun awarded Patapoutian the Lebanese Order of Merit.

In December 2021, Patapoutian received the American Academy of Achievement’s Golden Plate Award presented by Awards Council member Frances Arnold.

Recognition in Armenia
Patapoutian, the first Armenian Nobel laureate, received a hero's welcome when he visited Armenia in June 2022. Prime Minister Nikol Pashinyan awarded him the Order of St. Mesrop Mashtots, while the Armenian National Academy of Sciences elected him an honorary member, and the Yerevan State Medical University awarded him an honorary doctorate. Patapoutian gifted a replica of his Nobel medal to the History Museum of Armenia. HayPost issued a stamp dedicated to him.

Selected publications

PIEZO1 + PIEZO2

PIEZO2

References

External links 

 Ardem Patapoutian, PhD at Scripps Research (scripps.edu)
 The Patapoutian Lab (patapoutianlab.org)
 CV Patapoutian
 Ardem Patapoutian, PhD at Howard Hughes Medical Institute (hhmi.org)
 Ardem Patapoutian in Academic Tree (neurotree.org)
 

1967 births
American molecular biologists
American neuroscientists
American people of Armenian descent
American University of Beirut alumni
Armenian scientists
Lebanese emigrants to the United States
California Institute of Technology alumni
Lebanese people of Armenian descent
Living people
Nobel laureates in Physiology or Medicine
University of California, Los Angeles alumni